"Can't Get the Best of Me" is a song by American hip hop group Cypress Hill. The song was released as a single from the group's fifth studio album, Skull & Bones.

Track listing

Music video
The song's music video begins with a man in a locker room, lacing up his boots. The camera pans out to reveal a crowd of people in the room with him, who go into a factory for a fight. Another man is a bathroom alone getting ready for a fight, before he punches a mirror. The two men begin to fight while the crowd forms a circle pit around them. Many people are carried off from the fight, bloody and bruised. The two men return to the ring, standing back to back in the center of the crowd. Two other men join them before Sen Dog gives them a thumbs down and the crowd attacks them. The crowd engulfs the men, carrying two of them away and jumping the other two. The video ends with the same man at the video's start, sitting in the locker room and looking over his scars.

Chart positions

Notes

A  "Can't Get the Best of Me" and "Highlife" were released together as a double A-side in the United Kingdom.

References

2000 songs
2000 singles
Cypress Hill songs
Columbia Records singles
Songs written by Brad Wilk
Songs written by DJ Muggs
Songs written by B-Real
Songs written by Sen Dog
Song recordings produced by DJ Muggs